Corbeanu is a Romanian surname. Notable people with the surname include:

Florin Corbeanu (born 1976), Romanian rower
Theo Corbeanu (born 2002), Canadian soccer player

See also
Corbeau (disambiguation)

Romanian-language surnames